Gishakidu ( giš-ša3-ki-du10) was king of the Sumerian city-state of Umma and husband of queen Bara-irnun, circa 2400 BCE. He was the son of Il, king of Umma, and his reign lasted at least 4 years. He is particularly known from a gold votive plate by his queen, in which she describes her genealogy in great detail. The inscription on the plate reads:

The original royal line of Umma consisted in the filiation of Enakalle (possibly son of Ush) and his own son Ur-Lumma. When Ur-Lumma died, presumably without a son but certainly with a daughter named Bara-irnum, the throne was handed over to Il, son of Eanandu (who had no regnal title) and grandson (or nephew) of Enakalle. King Il was then succeeded by his own son Gishakidu. Bara-irnum married her cousin Gishakidu, thus re-uniting both stands of the royal family by a marital alliance.

Gishakidu is also known from a dedicatory inscription on a cylinder:

A foundation inscription in his name is also known.

References

24th-century BC Sumerian kings
Kings of Umma